Liliana Rodríguez (born 1996) is a Mexican footballer.

Liliana Rodríguez may also refer to:

Liliana Rodríguez (actress) (born 1967), Venezuelan singer and TV actress
Liliana Rodríguez, 1985 Federation Cup
Liliana Rodríguez, 1993 South American Cross Country Championships